Campbells Bay is a suburb of the North Shore located in Auckland, New Zealand. Centennial Park is a popular recreational space that has walking tracks and stunning harbour views.

History

The land at Campbells Bay was first purchased by John Logan Campbell in 1845. In the 1890s, Duncan Campbell, known for his shoe company, bought land in the area.

The Bay's beach has, along with adjacent Murrays Bay and Mairangi Bay, undergone civil works projects since 2004 to improve stormwater management.

Demographics

Campbells Bay had a population of 2,889 at the 2018 New Zealand census, an increase of 54 people (1.9%) since the 2013 census, and an increase of 201 people (7.5%) since the 2006 census. There were 957 households, comprising 1,407 males and 1,485 females, giving a sex ratio of 0.95 males per female. The median age was 43.1 years (compared with 37.4 years nationally), with 555 people (19.2%) aged under 15 years, 522 (18.1%) aged 15 to 29, 1,356 (46.9%) aged 30 to 64, and 459 (15.9%) aged 65 or older.

Ethnicities were 80.5% European/Pākehā, 4.2% Māori, 0.6% Pacific peoples, 18.2% Asian, and 2.9% other ethnicities. People may identify with more than one ethnicity.

The percentage of people born overseas was 37.2, compared with 27.1% nationally.

Although some people chose not to answer the census's question about religious affiliation, 56.6% had no religion, 34.0% were Christian, 0.7% were Hindu, 1.1% were Muslim, 0.6% were Buddhist and 1.9% had other religions.

Of those at least 15 years old, 981 (42.0%) people had a bachelor's or higher degree, and 159 (6.8%) people had no formal qualifications. The median income was $46,600, compared with $31,800 nationally. 813 people (34.8%) earned over $70,000 compared to 17.2% nationally. The employment status of those at least 15 was that 1,152 (49.4%) people were employed full-time, 408 (17.5%) were part-time, and 69 (3.0%) were unemployed.

Education

Campbells Bay Primary School is a coeducational contributing primary (years 1–6) school with a roll of  students as of

Local government

The suburb is currently under the local governance of the Auckland Council and is in the Albany ward, one of the thirteen administrative divisions of the city of Auckland.

References

External links 
Photographs of Campbells Bay held in Auckland Libraries' heritage collections.

Suburbs of Auckland
North Shore, New Zealand
East Coast Bays
Bays of the Auckland Region